Marguerite (Peggy) Moilliet Rogers (1915–1989) was a Mexican-born American physicist who became the "country's leading authority in the field of air-launched conventional weapons".

Life
Marguerite Moilliet was born on November 6, 1915, in Minatitlán, Veracruz, and raised in Texas. She did both her undergraduate and graduate studies at Rice University, and taught for two years at the University of Houston before joining the Naval Air Warfare Center, Indianapolis in 1943, becoming head of optics research there. After the end of World War II, she was briefly a researcher at the University of North Carolina before becoming a weapons researcher at the Oak Ridge National Laboratory and later the Naval Air Weapons Station China Lake. Her work at China Lake was interrupted for a year spent teaching physics at the Royal Technical College, Salford in England.

In 1953 she moved to South Carolina, to become professor of physics and head of the science division at Columbia College, near the University of South Carolina, where her husband Fred Terry Rogers Jr. became head of the physics department. He died in 1956, and she returned to China Lake in 1957. In 1966 she became head of the Weapons Systems Analysis Division there, and from 1977 to 1978 she was acting head of the laboratory.

She retired in 1980, and died on March 14, 1989, in Ridgecrest, California.

Recognition
Rogers became a Fellow of the American Physical Society in 1962. The Naval Weapons Center gave her their L. E. T. Thompson Award in 1966, and the American Ordnance Association gave her their Harvey C. Knowles Award in 1967. In 1976, she was given the Federal Woman's Award, in 1980 she received the Navy Distinguished Civilian Service Award, and in 1981 she was given the Department of Defense Distinguished Civilian Service Award.

References

1915 births
1989 deaths
American physicists
American women physicists
Weapons scientists and engineers
Rice University alumni
University of Houston faculty
Columbia College (South Carolina) faculty
Fellows of the American Physical Society
20th-century American women
American women academics
Mexican emigrants to the United States